Tepus  is a regency district (kapanewon) of Gunung Kidul Regency, Yogyakarta Special Region, Indonesia. The boundaries of Tepus District are with Girisubo District on the east side, Semanu District on the north side, Tanjungsari on the west side and the Indian Ocean on the South side.

Kelurahan (Administrative Village)
Tepus is divided into five kalurahan or administrative villages:
Kalurahan Tepus
Kalurahan Purwodadi
Kalurahan Sidoarjo
Kalurahan Sumberwungu
Kalurahan Giri Panggung

Demographics

Religion
Almost 90% of the villagers are Muslims. Islam grew slowly in the region and eventually became the only religion in this village.

Beach Tourism

There many beaches in this district, such as:
Banyunibo
Busung
Jagang Kulon
Jogan Beach
Klumpit
Nglambor Beach
Sundak
Ngetun
Ngondo
Nguluran
Ngungap
Pakundon
Sawahan
Siung Beach
Ngandong
Seruni
Songlibeng
Watutogok
Weru
Timang Beach
Muncar
Slili
Pulang Sawal/Indrayanti
Kelosirat
PokTunggal

Transportation
The village is passed by the provincial road link that connects East Java - Yogyakarta - Central Java - West Java - Jakarta via the south coast route. There is a mass transportation everyday from Daksinarga Terminal in Wonosari.

References

Gunung Kidul Regency
Districts of the Special Region of Yogyakarta